Marsham may refer to:

 Marsham (surname)
 Marsham, Norfolk, an English village
 Rabbi Sholom Mordechai Schwadron known by the acronym "Marsham" which is the Hebrew abbreviation of the initials Moreinu Rav Sholom Mordechai)

See also
 Marsham Street, street in Westminster, London, England